Vic and Flo Saw a Bear is a 2013 Canadian drama film directed by Denis Côté. The film premiered in competition at the 63rd Berlin International Film Festival, where it won the Alfred Bauer Prize.

The film stars Romane Bohringer and Pierrette Robitaille as Vic and Flo, lesbian lovers and former convicts who settle in the countryside of Quebec after Vic is released from prison. Marc-André Grondin also stars as Guillaume, Vic's parole officer who gets drawn into Vic and Flo's relationship drama as Vic begins to rebel against the constraints of her newly stable domestic life.

Cast
 Marc-André Grondin as Guillaume Perreira-Leduc
 Romane Bohringer as Florence Richemont
 Pierrette Robitaille as Victoria Champagne
 Inka Malovic as La Policière
 Marie Brassard as Marina St-Jean / Jackie
 Olivier Aubin as Nicolas Smith
 Guy Thauvette as Yvon Champagne
 Pier-Luc Funk as Charlot Smith
 Ted Pluviose as Lover

Awards
The film won the Prix collégial du cinéma québécois in 2014.

Robitaille won the Jutra Award for Best Actress at the 16th Jutra Awards. The film also received nominations for Best Director (Côté), Best Supporting Actress (Brassard), Best Screenplay (Côté) and Most Successful Film Outside Quebec.

Bohringer received a Vancouver Film Critics Circle nomination for Best Supporting Actress in a Canadian Film at the Vancouver Film Critics Circle Awards 2013.

References

External links
 

2013 films
2013 drama films
2013 LGBT-related films
Canadian drama films
Canadian LGBT-related films
Films directed by Denis Côté
Lesbian-related films
LGBT-related drama films
French-language Canadian films
2010s Canadian films